Roger Pyttel (born 8 May 1957 in Wolfen) is a former German butterfly swimmer. After failing to place in various races during the 1972 and 1976 Olympics, Pyttel attained both a silver and bronze medal in the 1980 Summer Olympics in Moscow.

References

German male swimmers
Olympic swimmers of East Germany
German male butterfly swimmers
Swimmers at the 1972 Summer Olympics
Swimmers at the 1976 Summer Olympics
Swimmers at the 1980 Summer Olympics
1957 births
Living people
World record setters in swimming
Olympic bronze medalists in swimming
German male freestyle swimmers
World Aquatics Championships medalists in swimming
European Aquatics Championships medalists in swimming
Medalists at the 1980 Summer Olympics
Olympic silver medalists for East Germany
Olympic bronze medalists for East Germany
Olympic silver medalists in swimming
People from Bitterfeld-Wolfen
People from Bezirk Halle
Sportspeople from Saxony-Anhalt